Lucas Andrés Pusineri Bignone (born 16 July 1976) is an Argentine football manager and former player. He is the current manager of Atlético Tucumán.

A midfielder, Pusineri began his career with Almagro in 1997, and enjoyed successful spells at San Lorenzo and Independiente. He retired with Platense in 2011, and subsequently became a manager.

Footballing career 

Pusineri started his professional football career in 1998 with a local club in Almagro, he had an impressive season of scoring 11 goals in 29 games, he was quickly signed by San Lorenzo where he helped the club to win the Clausura 2001 championship.

During his three years with Club Atletico San Lorenzo de Almagro, Pusineri made 61 appearances and scored 11 goals. In 2002, Pusineri was snapped up by Independiente, where he played a part in their championship season in Apertura 2002. In 2003, he moved to Russian Premier League side FC Saturn. After failing to make any impact on European soil, Pusineri decided to move back to Independiente in season 2004/2005.

In 2006, Pusineri was signed by Daniel Passarella, who took over from Reinaldo Merlo as the manager of River Plate but returned once again to Independiente in 2007.

Manager career
During the 2013-14 Championship, Pusineri worked with Adrián Domenech as technical assistant of Claudio Borghi for Argentinos Juniors.

Pusineri started his managerial career with Cúcuta Deportivo of the Primera B of Colombia as head coach.

Honours
San Lorenzo
Primera División (1): 2001 Clausura
Copa Mercosur (1): 2001

Independiente
Primera División (1): 2002 Apertura

Cúcuta Deportivo
Categoría Primera B (1): 2018

References

External links

Argentine Primera statistics at Fútbol XXI 

1976 births
Living people
Footballers from Buenos Aires
Argentine footballers
Argentine expatriate footballers
Club Almagro players
Club Atlético Independiente footballers
San Lorenzo de Almagro footballers
Club Atlético River Plate footballers
FC Saturn Ramenskoye players
Club Atlético Platense footballers
Argentine Primera División players
Russian Premier League players
Expatriate footballers in Russia
Argentine expatriate sportspeople in Russia
Association football midfielders
Argentine football managers
Argentine Primera División managers
Club Atlético Independiente managers
Categoría Primera A managers
Cúcuta Deportivo managers
Deportivo Cali managers
Atlético Tucumán managers
Argentine expatriate football managers
Argentine expatriate sportspeople in Colombia